Mataele is a surname. Notable people with the surname include:

Joey Joleen Mataele, Tongan transgender activist 
Manasa Mataele (born 1996), Fijian-Tongan rugby union player
Stan Mataele (born 1963), American football player

Tongan-language surnames